The Brandenberg Alps are a sub-group of the Northern Limestone Alps, that run in front of the Eastern Alps for their whole length. They lie entirely in Austria between Achensee in Tyrol, the Inn Valley and the Bavarian Prealps.

They are widely known in German as the Rofangebirge, although the actual Rofan (also Sonnwendgebirge) is only the western part of the area between the Brandenberger Ache stream and the Achensee lake. It consists of a central mountain group and three individual mountains. The Guffert, which is located outside the central group, forms a distinct mountain block. It is located north of Kramsach, between the Tegernsee Blauberge and the central Rofan. The Unnütze, at the northern end of the Achensee east of Achenkirch, and the Ebener Joch east of Maurach at the southern end of the Achensee, are also outside the central mountain range.

Neighbouring mountain ranges 

The Brandenberg Alps border on the following other sub-groups in the Alps:

 Bavarian Prealps (to the north)
 Kaisergebirge (to the east)
 Kitzbühel Alps (to the south)
 Tux Alps (to the southwest)
 Karwendel (to the west)

Central Group

Summits on the Rofan main ridge (Rofan-Hauptkamm) from west to east 
Klobenjochspitze
Kotalmjoch
Stuhljöchl
Stuhlböcklkopf
Streichkopf
Hochiss, highest summit in the Rofan
Spieljoch
Seekarlspitze
Roßkopf (Nordgipfel )
Rofanspitze

Summits on the Dalfaz Walls from north to south 
Dalfázer Joch
Dalfázer Köpfln
Dalfázer Wand
Dalfázer Roßkopf
Rotspitze

Summits on the ridge starting south of the Rofanspitze 
Sagzahn
Schokoladetafel
Vorderes Sonnwendjoch
Haidachstellwand

Summits in the Brandenberg Alps from northeast to southwest 
Pendling, southwest of Kufstein
Köglhörndl
Hundsalmjoch
Kienberg, northeast of Brandenberg

Waterbodies 

Zireiner See

External links 
 
 Photographs and tour descriptions 

 
Mountain ranges of the Alps
Northern Limestone Alps
Mountain ranges of Tyrol (state)